North Zanesville is a census-designated place (CDP) in Muskingum County, Ohio, United States, just north of the city of Zanesville, along the Muskingum River. The population was 3,013 at the 2000 census.

Geography
North Zanesville is located at  (39.984555, -82.001067).

Demographics

As of the census of 2000, there were 3,013 people, 1,223 households, and 917 families residing in the CDP. The population density was 838.8 people per square mile (324.0/km2). There were 1,262 housing units at an average density of 351.4/sq mi (135.7/km2). The racial makeup of the CDP was 95.65% White, 1.76% African American, 0.07% Native American, 1.49% Asian, 0.23% from other races, and 0.80% from two or more races. Hispanic or Latino of any race were 0.40% of the population.

There were 1,223 households, out of which 28.1% had children under the age of 18 living with them, 65.7% were married couples living together, 7.0% had a female householder with no husband present, and 25.0% were non-families. 21.5% of all households were made up of individuals, and 11.4% had someone living alone who was 65 years of age or older. The average household size was 2.46 and the average family size was 2.86.

In the CDP, the population was spread out, with 23.2% under the age of 18, 4.9% from 18 to 24, 23.1% from 25 to 44, 27.3% from 45 to 64, and 21.5% who were 65 years of age or older. The median age was 44 years. For every 100 females, there were 87.8 males. For every 100 females age 18 and over, there were 86.1 males.

The median income for a household in the CDP was $51,306, and the median income for a family was $57,684. Males had a median income of $41,838 versus $30,625 for females. The per capita income for the CDP was $25,075. About 3.5% of families and 5.2% of the population were below the poverty line, including 6.5% of those under age 18 and 3.0% of those age 65 or over.

References

Census-designated places in Muskingum County, Ohio
Census-designated places in Ohio
Muskingum River